Bailey Hills is a summit located in Central New York Region of New York located in the Town of Remsen in Oneida County, northwest of Ninety Six Corners.

References

Mountains of Oneida County, New York
Mountains of New York (state)